Khasehlar (also Romanized as Khāşehlar; also known as Khaşīl) is a village in Shurakat-e Jonubi Rural District, Ilkhchi District, Osku County, East Azerbaijan Province, Iran. At the 2006 census, its population was 957, in 238 families.

References 

Populated places in Osku County